Chukchansi Gold Resort & Casino is a Native American casino located just off of State Route 41 in Coarsegold, California, between Fresno and Yosemite National Park. It is owned and operated by the Picayune Rancheria of Chukchansi Indians.

The  casino has 1,800 slot machines, and 43 table games. Chukchansi Gold Resort & Casino features a 370-seat buffet, Vintage Steakhouse, over 400 hotel rooms and suites, a full service spa and various other amenities.

History
In June 2000, the Picayune Rancheria Tribe of Chukchansi Indians announced plans of constructing a resort casino close to Yosemite National Park. Construction was slated to begin in August 2000, but problems delayed groundbreaking. In March 2002, the resort casino was approved by the National Indian Gaming Commission. On October 29, 2002, groundbreaking for the Chuckchansi Gold Resort and Casino began. The forecast cost of the project was $150 million.

The casino opened on June 25, 2003, while the resort opened on August 22, 2003. In 2006, the casino bought the naming rights to Chukchansi Park in Fresno.

Armed Takeover and Reopening
On October 9, 2014, a confrontation occurred when a group of armed police officers and rival factions entered the casino in an attempt to take over control, handcuffing and detaining officers and employees reporting to the existing leadership. The casino was closed on the following day. Ultimately 15 people were charged in the takeover, including active-duty police officers.

The tribe brought in new casino leadership to revamp operations and reopen the casino.  New Chief Operations officer Christian Goode, negotiated with the NIGC and local officials in California, and reached a new deal with Unite Here! Local 19 on an agreement to guarantee good paying jobs and benefits for about 700 casino employees with annual wage increases.  The Tribe has also named Phil Hogen, former Chairman of the NIGC as Chairman of Chukchansi Tribal Gaming Commission and Joe Smith, former Director of Audits and Finance for NIGC as Commissioner of the Tribe’s Gaming Commission.

The Casino reopened on December 31, 2015, and a formal Grand Reopening Ceremony took place on January 15, 2016.

See also
 Chukchansi language

References

External links
 Chukchansi Gold Resort & Casino website
 Hotel Online

Yokuts
Buildings and structures in Madera County, California
Casinos completed in 2003
Casinos in California
Hotel buildings completed in 2003
Native American casinos
Tourist attractions in Madera County, California